Representative Smith may refer to numerous representatives.

United States Representatives

A
Abraham Herr Smith (1815–1894), U.S. Representative from Pennsylvania
Adam Smith (Washington politician) (born 1965), U.S. Representative from Washington
Addison T. Smith (1862–1956), U.S. Representative from Idaho
Adrian Smith (politician) (born 1970), U.S. Representative from Nebraska
Albert Smith (Maine politician) (1793–1867)
Albert Smith (New York politician) (1805–1870), U.S. Representative from New York
Albert L. Smith Jr. (1931–1997), U.S. Representative from Alabama
Arthur Smith (U.S. Representative) (1785–1853), U.S. Representative from Virginia

B
Ballard Smith, U.S. Representative from Virginia
Bernard Smith (New Jersey politician) (1776–1835), U.S. Representative from New Jersey
Bob Smith (New Hampshire politician) (born 1941)

C
Caleb Blood Smith (1808–1864), U.S. Representative from Indiana
Charles Bennett Smith (1870–1939), U.S. Representative from New York
Chris Smith (New Jersey politician) (born 1953), U.S. Representative from New Jersey
Charles Brooks Smith (1844–1899), U.S. Representative from West Virginia
Clyde H. Smith (1876–1940)

D
David Highbaugh Smith (1854–1928)
Denny Smith (born 1938), U.S. Representative from Oregon
Dietrich C. Smith (1840–1914)

E
Edward H. Smith (politician) (1809–1885), U.S. Representative from New York

F
Francis Ormand Jonathan Smith (1806–1876)
Francis R. Smith (1911–1982), U.S. Representative from Pennsylvania
Frank Ellis Smith (1918–1997), U.S. Representative from Mississippi
Frank L. Smith (1867–1950)
Frank Owens Smith (1859–1924), U.S. Representative from Maryland
Frederick Cleveland Smith (1884–1956)

G
George Smith (Pennsylvania politician), U.S. Representative from Pennsylvania
George J. Smith (1859–1913), U.S. Representative from New York
George Luke Smith (1837–1884), U.S. Representative from Louisiana
George Ross Smith (1864–1952)
George Washington Smith (congressman) (1846–1907)
Gerrit Smith (1797–1874), U.S. Representative from New York
Gomer Griffith Smith (1896–1953), U.S. Representative from Oklahoma
Green Clay Smith (1826–1895)

H
H. Allen Smith (California politician) (1909–1998), U.S. Representative from California
Henry Smith (Wisconsin politician) (1838–1916), U.S. Representative from Wisconsin
Henry C. Smith (politician) (1856–1911), U.S. Representative from Michigan
Henry P. Smith III (1911–1995), U.S. Representative from New York
Hezekiah Bradley Smith (1816–1887), U.S. Representative from New Jersey
Hiram Y. Smith (1843–1894), U.S. Representative from Iowa
Horace B. Smith (1826–1888), U.S. Representative from New York
Howard W. Smith (1883–1976), U.S. Representative from Virginia

I
Isaac Smith (New Jersey politician) (1740–1807), U.S. Representative from New Jersey
Isaac Smith (Pennsylvania politician) (1761–1834), U.S. Representative from Pennsylvania
Israel Smith (1759–1810), U.S. Representative from Vermont

J
J. Hyatt Smith (1824–1886), U.S. Representative from New York
J. Joseph Smith (1904–1980), U.S. Representative from Connecticut
James Strudwick Smith (1787–1852), U.S. Representative from North Carolina
James Vernon Smith (1926–1973), U.S. Representative from Oklahoma
Jason Smith (American politician) (born 1980), U.S. Representative from Missouri
Jedediah K. Smith (1770–1828)
Jeremiah Smith (lawyer) (1759–1842)
Joe L. Smith (1880–1962), U.S. Representative from West Virginia
John Smith (New York politician, born 1752) (1752–1816), U.S. Representative from New York
John Smith (Vermont politician) (1789–1858), U.S. Representative from Vermont
John Smith (Virginia representative) (1750–1836), U.S. Representative from Virginia
John Ambler Smith (1847–1892), U.S. Representative from Virginia
John Armstrong Smith (1814–1892)
John Cotton Smith (1765–1845), U.S. Representative from Connecticut
John M. C. Smith (1853–1923), U.S. Representative from Michigan
John Quincy Smith (1824–1901)
John Speed Smith (1792–1854), U.S. Representative from Kentucky
John T. Smith (congressman) (1801–1864), U.S. Representative from Pennsylvania
John Walter Smith (1845–1925), U.S. Representative from Maryland
Joseph Showalter Smith (1824–1884), U.S. Representative from Oregon
Joseph F. Smith (Pennsylvania politician) (1920–1999), U.S. Representative from Pennsylvania
Josiah Smith (1738–1803), U.S. Representative from Massachusetts

L
Lamar Smith (born 1947), U.S. Representative from Texas
Larkin I. Smith (1944–1989), U.S. Representative from Mississippi
Lawrence H. Smith (1892–1958), U.S. Representative from Wisconsin
Lawrence J. Smith (born 1941), U.S. Representative from Florida
Linda Smith (American politician) (born 1950), U.S. Representative from Washington

M
Madison Roswell Smith (1850–1919), U.S. Representative from Missouri
Margaret Chase Smith (1897–1995)
Martin F. Smith (1891–1954), U.S. Representative from Washington

N
Nathaniel Smith (1762–1822), U.S. Representative from Connecticut
Neal Edward Smith (born 1920), U.S. Representative from Iowa
Nick Smith (American politician) (born 1934), U.S. Representative from Michigan

O
O'Brien Smith ( 1756–1811), U.S. Representative from South Carolina
Oliver H. Smith (1794–1859), U.S. Representative from Indiana

P
Peter Plympton Smith (born 1945), U.S. Representative from Vermont

R
Robert Freeman Smith (1931–2020), U.S. Representative from Oregon
Robert Rhett Smith (1800–1876), U.S. Representative from South Carolina
Robert Smith (Illinois politician) (1802–1867)

S
Samuel Smith (Maryland politician) (1752–1839), U.S. Representative from Maryland
Samuel Smith (New Hampshire politician) (1765–1842)
Samuel Smith (Pennsylvania politician), U.S. Representative from Pennsylvania
Samuel A. Smith (1795–1861), U.S. Representative from Pennsylvania
Samuel Axley Smith (1822–1863), U.S. Representative from Tennessee
Samuel William Smith (1852–1931), U.S. Representative from Michigan
Sylvester C. Smith (1858–1913), U.S. Representative from California

T
Thomas Smith (Indiana congressman) (1799–1876), U.S. Representative from Indiana
Thomas Smith (Pennsylvania congressman) (1773–1846), U.S. Representative from Pennsylvania
Thomas Alexander Smith (1850–1932), U.S. Representative from Maryland
Thomas Francis Smith (1865–1923), U.S. Representative from New York
Thomas Vernor Smith (1890–1964)
Truman Smith (1791–1884), U.S. Representative from Connecticut

V
Virginia D. Smith (1911–2006), U.S. Representative from Nebraska

W
Walter I. Smith (1862–1922), U.S. Representative from Iowa
William Smith (Maryland politician) (1728–1814), U.S. Representative from Maryland
William Smith (South Carolina representative) (1751–1837), U.S. Representative from South Carolina
William Smith (Virginia governor) (1797–1887), U.S. Representative from Virginia
William Smith (Virginia representative), U.S. Representative from Virginia
William Alden Smith (1859–1932), U.S. Representative from Michigan
William Alexander Smith (politician) (1828–1888), U.S. Representative from North Carolina
William Ephraim Smith (1829–1890), U.S. Representative from Georgia
William Jay Smith (Tennessee politician) (1823–1913), U.S. Representative from Tennessee
William Loughton Smith (1758–1812), U.S. Representative from South Carolina
William Nathan Harrell Smith (1812–1889), U.S. Representative from North Carolina
William Orlando Smith (1859–1932), U.S. Representative from Pennsylvania
William Robert Smith (1863–1924), U.S. Representative from Texas
William Russell Smith (1815–1896), U.S. Representative from Alabama
William Stephens Smith (1755–1816), U.S. Representative from New York
Wint Smith (1892–1976), U.S. Representative from Kansas
Worthington Curtis Smith (1823–1894), U.S. Representative from Vermont

U.S. state representatives

Alabama
Charles Spencer Smith (1852–1923)
Phil Smith (Alabama politician) (1931–2020)
Robert Hardy Smith (1813–1878)
William Smith (South Carolina senator) (1762–1840)
William Russell Smith (1815–1896)

Alaska
Sally Smith (politician) (born 1945)

Arizona
David Burnell Smith (1941–2014)
Steve Smith (Arizona politician)
Tom Smith (Arizona politician) (born 1927)

Arkansas
Brandt Smith (born 1959)
Charles F. Smith (politician) (1912–1962)
Fred Smith (Arkansas politician)
Ray S. Smith Jr. (1924–2007)

Connecticut
Asa Smith (politician) (1829–1907)
Edwin O. Smith (died 1960)
Nathaniel Smith (1762–1822)
Perry Smith (politician) (1783–1852)
Richard A. Smith (Connecticut politician)
Truman Smith (1791–1884)

Delaware
Melanie George Smith (born 1972)
Michael F. Smith

Florida
Carlos Guillermo Smith (born 1980)
Chris Smith (Florida politician) (born 1970)
Chuck Smith (Florida politician) (born 1928)
David Smith (Florida politician) (born 1960)
Eric B. Smith (born 1942)
Frank Smith (Florida settler)
Jimmie Todd Smith (born 1965)
Kelly R. Smith (born 1946)
Ken Smith (American politician) (born 1926)
Lawrence J. Smith (born 1941)

Georgia
George L. Smith (Georgia politician) (1912–1973)
George T. Smith (1916–2010)
James Monroe Smith (Georgia planter) (1839–1915)
Lynn Smith (politician) (born 1945)
Michael Smith (Georgia politician)
Richard H. Smith (born 1945)
Vance Smith

Idaho
Elaine Smith (Idaho politician)
Leon Smith (politician) (born 1937)

Illinois
Calvin Smith (politician) (1907–1968)
Derrick Smith (politician)
Dietrich C. Smith (1840–1914)
Michael K. Smith (Illinois politician) (1966–2014)
Nicholas Smith (Illinois politician)
Ora Smith (1884–1965)
Robert Smith (Illinois politician) (1802–1867)
William Smith (Latter Day Saints) (1811–1893)
William M. Smith

Indiana
Caleb Blood Smith (1808–1864)
Marcus C. Smith (1825–1900)
Milo E. Smith (born 1950)
Oliver H. Smith (1794–1859)
Thomas Smith (Indiana congressman) (1799–1876)
Vernon Smith (Indiana politician) (born 1944)

Iowa
Israel A. Smith (1876–1958)
Jeff Smith (Iowa politician) (born 1967)
Mark Smith (Iowa politician) (born 1952)
Ras Smith (born 1987)

Kansas
Chuck Smith (Kansas politician) (born 1951)
Ira Harvey Smith (1815–1883)

Kentucky
Brandon Smith (politician) (born 1967)
David Highbaugh Smith (1854–1928)
Green Clay Smith (1826–1895)
John Speed Smith (1792–1854)

Louisiana
Gary Smith Jr. (born 1972)
George Luke Smith (1837–1884)
James Peyton Smith (1925–2006)
Jasper K. Smith (1905–1992)
John R. Smith (politician, born 1945)
Patricia Haynes Smith (born 1946)

Maine
Albert Smith (Maine politician) (1793–1867)
Clyde H. Smith (1876–1940)
Douglas Smith (Maine politician) (born 1946)
Ormandel Smith (1842–1915)
Samuel E. Smith (1788–1860)

Massachusetts
George Edwin Smith (1849–1919)
Josiah Smith (1738–1803)
Samuel E. Smith (1788–1860)
Stephen Stat Smith (born 1955)

Michigan
Alma Wheeler Smith (born 1941)
Calvin Smith (Michigan politician) (died 1838)
Charles Wallace Smith (1864–1939)
George A. Smith (Michigan politician) (1825–1893)
James F. Smith (Michigan politician) (1923–2007)
Joseph Smith (Michigan politician) (1809–1880)
Nick Smith (American politician) (born 1934)
Virgil C. Smith (born 1947)
Virgil Smith Jr. (born 1979)

Minnesota
Dennis Smith (politician)
Edward Everett Smith (1861–1931)
George Ross Smith (1864–1952)
Steve Smith (Minnesota politician) (1949–2014)

Mississippi
Ferr Smith (born 1941)
Jeff Smith (Mississippi politician) (born 1949)

Missouri
Clem Smith (politician)
Jason Smith (American politician) (born 1980)
Joe Smith (Missouri politician) (born 1970s)
Mellcene Thurman Smith (1871–1957)

Montana
Bridget Smith (politician)
Cary Smith (politician) (born 1950)
Frank Smith (Montana politician) (born 1942)

New Hampshire
Jedediah K. Smith (1770–1828)
Kevin H. Smith (born 1977)
Marjorie Smith (born 1941)
Steven D. Smith (born 1964)
Timothy Smith (politician) (born 1980)

New Mexico
James Smith (New Mexico politician)

North Carolina
Benjamin Smith (North Carolina politician) (1756–1826)
Carson Smith (politician) (born 1960s)
James Strudwick Smith (1787–1852)
Kandie Smith (born 1969)
McNeill Smith (1918–2011)
Raymond Smith Jr. (born 1961)
William Nathan Harrell Smith (1812–1889)
Willis Smith (1887–1953)

Ohio
Geoffrey C. Smith (politician)
Harry Clay Smith (1863–1941)
Jeffery Todd Smith
John Armstrong Smith (1814–1892)
John Quincy Smith (1824–1901)
Kent Smith (American politician) (born 1966)
Larry G. Smith (1914–1992)
Ryan Smith (Ohio politician) (born 1973)
Shirley Smith (politician) (born 1950)

Oklahoma
Jerry L. Smith (1943–2015)

Oregon
David Brock Smith
Greg Smith (Oregon politician) (born 1968)
Jefferson Smith (politician) (born 1973)
Norm Smith (American politician) (born 1947)
Patti Smith (politician) (1946–2017)
Tootie Smith (born 1957)
Wesley O. Smith (1878–1951)

Pennsylvania
Abraham Herr Smith (1815–1894)
Barbara McIlvaine Smith (born 1950)
Bruce I. Smith (born 1934)
Charles C. Smith (Pennsylvania politician) (1908–1970)
Clark S. Smith (1912–2014)
Earl H. Smith (1909–1987)
Isaac Smith (Pennsylvania politician) (1761–1834)
Kenneth J. Smith
L. Eugene Smith (1921–2019)
Matthew H. Smith (born 1972)
Samuel H. Smith (politician) (born 1955)
Thomas Smith (Pennsylvania congressman) (1773–1846)
Thomas Smith (Pennsylvania judge) (1745–1809)
Thomas B. Smith (mayor) (1869–1949)
William Orlando Smith (1859–1932)
William Rudolph Smith (1787–1868)

Rhode Island
Mary Ann Shallcross Smith (born 1952)
Edward J. Smith (American politician) (1927–2010)

South Carolina
Charles Aurelius Smith (1861–1916)
Clary Hood Smith (1928–2019)
Ellison D. Smith (1864–1944)
G. Murrell Smith Jr. (born 1968)
Garry R. Smith (born 1957)
J. Roland Smith (born 1933)
James E. Smith Jr. (born 1967)
Mark Smith (South Carolina politician)
O'Brien Smith (1750s–1811)
W. Douglas Smith (born 1958)
William Smith (South Carolina senator) (1762–1840)
William Loughton Smith (1758–1812)

South Dakota
Jamie Smith (politician)

Tennessee
Eddie Smith (politician) (born 1979)
Robin Smith (politician) (born 1963)

Texas
Burrell P. Smith (1823–1859)
Lamar Smith (born 1947)
Preston Smith (governor) (1912–2003)
Reggie Smith (Texas politician)
Robert Lloyd Smith (1861–1942)
Wayne Smith (Texas politician) (born 1943)

Vermont
Charles Manley Smith (1868–1937)
Charles Plympton Smith (born 1954)
Edward Curtis Smith (1854–1935)
Harvey Smith (American politician) (born 1945)
Heman R. Smith (1795–1861)
Israel Smith (1759–1810)
J. Gregory Smith (1818–1891)
John Smith (Vermont politician) (1789–1858)
Levi P. Smith (1885–1970)
Noah Smith (judge) (1756–1812)
Shap Smith (born 1965)
Worthington Curtis Smith (1823–1894)

Washington
Cleveland Smith (1853–1935)
Hiram F. Smith (1829–1893)
John B. Smith (Washington politician) (1837–1917)
Linda Smith (American politician) (born 1950)
Norma Smith
Sam Smith (American politician) (1922–1995)

Wyoming
Nels J. Smith (born 1939)
Nels H. Smith (1884–1976)

Hawaiian Kingdom representatives
William Owen Smith (1848–1929)

See also
List of people with surname Smith
Senator Smith (disambiguation)